Bernardo is an unincorporated community in northeast Colorado County, in the U.S. state of Texas. The small community is located on FM 949 between Interstate 10 (I-10) and Cat Spring. The town was first settled by German immigrants in the 1840s and was on a main east-west road as early as the American Civil War. Though the community once had its own post office and school, these had long disappeared by 2013. A United States Geological Survey (USGS) 7.5' x 7.5' Quadrangle Map is named Bernardo.

Geography

History
The earliest settlers in the area were German immigrants who were part of the Adelsverein colonization effort of 1845. Though the immigrants were supposed to settle farther west in the Fisher–Miller Land Grant, they chose to stay in a region that already had a few German settlers. Braden and Bernardo Prairie were two early names for the small settlement that sprang up. Bernardo was situated on the main highway from Houston to the interior of Texas. During the American Civil War, it became a way station for cotton being transported to Mexico by wagon. The Sisters of Divine Providence, a Catholic order, established a school at Bernardo in 1872. A post office was opened in the settlement in 1898. The school was consolidated with the Mentz Catholic school in 1911. The post office was discontinued in 1917. Through the years Bernardo remained a thinly populated community of farmers and ranchers. The school eventually merged with the Columbus Independent School District. The 1958 USGS Bernardo Quadrangle Map shows the Bernardo School. In 1986 the Bernardo precinct counted 187 registered voters and the community had a general store and a volunteer fire department. From 1990 to 2000 the number of residents remained at 155. The former school appears to be abandoned in the 2013 satellite image. In 2016 a new fire station replaced the older one.

References

Unincorporated communities in Texas
Unincorporated communities in Colorado County, Texas